The group stage of the 2013–14 UEFA Europa League was played from 19 September to 12 December 2013. A total of 48 teams competed in the group stage.

Draw
The draw was held on 30 August 2013, 13:00 CEST (UTC+2), at the Grimaldi Forum, Monaco. The 48 teams were allocated into four pots based on their UEFA club coefficients at the beginning of the season. They were drawn into twelve groups of four containing one team from each of the four seeding pots, with the restriction that teams from the same national association could not be drawn against each other. Moreover, the draw was controlled for teams from the same association in order to split the teams evenly into the two sets of groups (A–F, G–L) for maximum television coverage.

The fixtures were decided after the draw. On each matchday, six groups played their matches at 19:00 CEST/CET, while the other six groups played their matches at 21:05 CEST/CET, with the two sets of groups (A–F, G–L) alternating between each matchday. There were other restrictions, e.g., teams from the same city (e.g., Sevilla and Real Betis) in general did not play at home on the same matchday (UEFA tried to avoid teams from the same city playing at home on the same day), and Russian and Kazakh teams did not play at home on the last matchday due to cold weather.

Teams
Below were the 48 teams which qualified for the group stage (with their 2013 UEFA club coefficients), grouped by their seeding pot. They included 7 teams which entered in this stage, the 29 winners of the play-off round, the 9 losers of the Champions League play-off round, and 3 teams which qualified due to disqualification of other teams:
Maccabi Tel Aviv: On 14 August 2013, Metalist Kharkiv were disqualified from the 2013–14 UEFA club competitions because of previous match-fixing. UEFA decided to replace Metalist Kharkiv in the Champions League play-off round with PAOK, who were eliminated by Metalist Kharkiv in the third qualifying round. Thus, Maccabi Tel Aviv, the opponent of PAOK in the Europa League play-off round, qualified directly for the Europa League group stage.
Tromsø: On 25 June 2013, Beşiktaş were banned by UEFA from the 2013–14 UEFA club competitions because of the 2011 Turkish sports corruption scandal. They appealed the ban to the Court of Arbitration for Sport, and on 18 July 2013 it was ruled that the ban should be temporarily lifted and they should be included in the qualifying round draws of the Europa League, until the final decision to be made before the end of August 2013. Beşiktaş competed in the Europa League play-off round and won. On 30 August 2013, the Court of Arbitration for Sport upheld UEFA's ban, meaning Beşiktaş were banned from the 2013–14 UEFA Europa League. UEFA decided to replace Beşiktaş in the Europa League group stage with Tromsø, who were eliminated by Beşiktaş in the play-off round.
APOEL: On 25 June 2013, Fenerbahçe were banned by UEFA from the 2013–14 UEFA club competitions because of the 2011 Turkish sports corruption scandal. They appealed the ban to the Court of Arbitration for Sport, and on 18 July 2013 it was ruled that the ban should be temporarily lifted and they should be included in the qualifying round draws of the Champions League, until the final decision to be made before the end of August 2013. Fenerbahçe competed in the Champions League qualifying rounds and lost in the play-off round. On 28 August 2013, the Court of Arbitration for Sport upheld UEFA's ban, meaning Fenerbahçe were banned from the 2013–14 UEFA Europa League. A draw was held on 30 August 2013, 09:00, in Monaco, to select a team to replace Fenerbahçe in the Europa League group stage among the teams eliminated in the play-off round, and was won by APOEL.

Notes

Format
In each group, teams played against each other home-and-away in a round-robin format. The group winners and runners-up advanced to the round of 32, where they were joined by the eight third-placed teams from the Champions League group stage.

Tiebreakers
The teams are ranked according to points (3 points for a win, 1 point for a draw, 0 points for a loss). If two or more teams are equal on points on completion of the group matches, the following criteria are applied to determine the rankings:
higher number of points obtained in the group matches played among the teams in question;
superior goal difference from the group matches played among the teams in question;
higher number of goals scored in the group matches played among the teams in question;
higher number of goals scored away from home in the group matches played among the teams in question;
If, after applying criteria 1 to 4 to several teams, two teams still have an equal ranking, criteria 1 to 4 are reapplied exclusively to the matches between the two teams in question to determine their final rankings. If this procedure does not lead to a decision, criteria 6 to 8 apply;
superior goal difference from all group matches played;
higher number of goals scored from all group matches played;
higher number of coefficient points accumulated by the club in question, as well as its association, over the previous five seasons.

Groups
The matchdays were 19 September, 3 October, 24 October, 7 November, 28 November and 12 December 2013. The match kickoff times were 19:00 and 21:05 CEST/CET, except for matches in Russia, which were 18:00 CEST/CET; and in Kazakhstan, where the first two were 18:00 CEST/CET and the last one was 16:00 CEST/CET. Times up to 26 October 2013 (matchdays 1–3) were CEST (UTC+2), thereafter (matchdays 4–6) times were CET (UTC+1).

Group A

Tiebreakers
Kuban Krasnodar are ranked ahead of St. Gallen on head-to-head goal difference.

Group B

Notes

Group C

Group D

Tiebreakers
Maribor are ranked ahead of Zulte Waregem on head-to-head goal difference.

Notes

Group E

Notes

Group F

Group G

Notes

Group H

Group I

Group J

Notes

Group K

Notes

Group L

Tiebreakers
AZ are ranked ahead of PAOK on head-to-head away goals.

Notes

References

External links
2013–14 UEFA Europa League

2
2013-14